Ethiopianism may refer to:

 Ethiopian studies, the western academic study of Ethiopian history and culture
 The Ethiopian movement, a social movement the began in Southern Africa in the late 19th and 20th centuries
 The Ethiopian nationalism, political parlance of civic nationalism in Ethiopia